Arnold Eugene "Sally" Suddith (December 26, 1910 – September 14, 1984) was an American professional basketball player. He played for the Indianapolis Kautskys in the National Basketball League during the 1939–40 season and averaged 2.3 points per game.

References

1910 births
1984 deaths
Amateur Athletic Union men's basketball players
American men's basketball players
Basketball players from Indiana
Guards (basketball)
Indiana Hoosiers men's basketball players
Indianapolis Kautskys players
People from Martinsville, Indiana